Robert Rankin (7 April 1905 – 25 August 1954) was a Scottish football player and manager. He played for hometown club St Mirren over two spells, and for Dundee and Clyde, mainly as an inside left. He gained three caps for Scotland in 1929, scoring twice.

He later acted as a director of St Mirren  then served as manager of the club for eight seasons from 1946 (plus one wartime campaign prior to that), and was still in the post when he died in 1954 aged 49.

References

External links
Scottish FA profile

1905 births
1954 deaths
Footballers from Paisley, Renfrewshire
Association football inside forwards
Scottish footballers
St Mirren F.C. players
Strathclyde F.C. players
Kilwinning Rangers F.C. players
Beith F.C. players
Dundee F.C. players
Clyde F.C. players
Scottish Junior Football Association players
Scottish Football League players
Scottish Football League managers
Scotland international footballers
Scottish football managers
St Mirren F.C. managers